JG or J. G. may refer to:

 Jagdgeschwader unit of the Imperial German Air Service of World War I or the Luftwaffe (German air force), in World War II
 Job guarantee, a proposal for full employment
 The Journal Gazette, a newspaper in Fort Wayne, Indiana, United States
 Junior grade, subdivision of various military ranks
 Josh Gordon, an American football wide receiver
 Jonita Gandhi, Indian-born-Canadian singer
 JETGO Australia, an airline (IATA code JG)